The 2014 Quicken Loans 400 was a NASCAR Sprint Cup Series stock car race that was held on June 15, 2014, at Michigan International Speedway in Brooklyn, Michigan. Contested over 200 laps on the  superspeedway, it was the 15th race of the 2014 NASCAR Sprint Cup Series. Jimmie Johnson won the race, his third win of the season and his first at Michigan. Kevin Harvick finished second, while Brad Keselowski, Paul Menard, and Kasey Kahne rounded out the Top 5. The top rookies in the race were Kyle Larson (8th), Justin Allgaier (16th), and Michael Annett (21st).

Previous week's race
At Pocono Raceway, Dale Earnhardt Jr. took the lead from Brad Keselowski with five laps to go and took the checkered flag in the Pocono 400. Earnhardt made the winning move after Keselowski slowed his car behind Danica Patrick to remove trash from the grill opening on the front of his car. "That's unfortunate for him," Earnhardt said. "He had me beat. I couldn't get to him. It's real hard to pass here. I've lost some in strange ways. It feels good to win one like that. Brad definitely had the better car. I'll own up to that, but we won the race." Keselowski was disappointed with the finish. "It was running really hot, the motor was going to blow up. I had to do something. We had a really fast car, but had a piece of debris and had to do something. I had to do some kind of move or it wasn't going to make it. I should have just run it. I didn't think it would make it, but maybe it would have."

Report

Background

Opened in 1960, the track's turns are banked at eighteen degrees, while the 3,600-foot-long front stretch, the location of the finish line, is banked at twelve degrees. The back stretch, has a five degree banking and is 2,242 feet long. Michigan International Speedway has a grandstand seating capacity of 84,000 people. Greg Biffle is the defending race winner after winning the race in 2013.

Entry list
The entry list for the Quicken Loans 400 was released on Tuesday, June 10, 2014 at 8:30 a.m. Eastern time. Forty-four drivers were entered for the race.

Practice

First practice

Qualifying

"I think that is just a credit on our Budweiser and Stewart-Haas race team for putting fast race cars on the track," Harvick said. "When you put it together with the Hendrick Motorsports engine package it creates a lot of speed and it makes coming to these place a lot of fun. Really excited to start on the pole and get that first pit box and hopefully we can put the whole day together on Sunday." Jeff Gordon, who qualified second, stated that he had "put up a heck of a lap ... just not enough to get Harvick". Ryan Truex was the only driver that failed to qualify.

Qualifying results

Practice (post-qualifying)

Second practice

Final practice

Race

First half

Start
The race was scheduled to start at 1:15 p.m. Eastern time but started five minutes later, with Kevin Harvick leading the field to the green flag. Brian Vickers got loose and hit the wall in turn three and was T-boned by Travis Kvapil to bring out the first caution of the race, on the opening lap. The race restarted on lap seven, before Kyle Larson got loose off turn two and went spinning to bring out the second caution. Kasey Kahne, Ricky Stenhouse Jr. and Martin Truex Jr. were also involved. The race restarted on lap 12 and finally completed a lap under green. Jeff Gordon took the race lead from Harvick on lap 19, before green flag stops began on lap 38. Brad Keselowski took the lead on lap 43, as he was the last car to pit, and the lead cycled back to Gordon.

Gordon got caught in lapped traffic and Harvick retook the lead on lap 57. Debris in turn three brought out the third caution on lap 72. Jimmie Johnson took the lead from Harvick during the pit cycle. Johnson led the field to the green on the restart and Kyle Busch, who restarted sixth, did not get going and had to come down pit road due to a burnt left-rear wheel hub. Joey Logano took the lead from Johnson on the restart, for the sixth lead change of the race on lap 78, before Johnson retook the lead from Logano on lap 92. David Ragan brought out the fourth caution of the race on lap 103 for a spin in turn four, and Harvick retook the lead during the pit cycle and led the field to the restart on lap 108. Alex Bowman brought out the fifth caution on lap 110, when he hit the wall in turn two.

Second half
Harvick led the field to the restart on lap 114 and Brett Moffitt brought out the sixth caution when he spun through turn four, with Harvick leading the field to the restart once again, on lap 120. Denny Hamlin got loose in turn three, making contact with Aric Almirola and spun to bring out the seventh caution of the race, on lap 122. Harvick stayed out when most of the other cars came in to pit, and led the field to the restart on lap 128. Joey Logano took the lead on the restart, but later in the run, Harvick retook the lead on lap 142. Debris in turn two brought out the eighth caution on lap 148. Jamie McMurray stayed out during the pit cycle to take the lead, while Larson was caught speeding off pit road.

Closing laps

McMurray led the field to the restart on lap 153 but he spun the tires and gave the lead back to Johnson. Johnson gave up the lead to make his final stop on lap 165 and gave the lead back to Jamie McMurray, with the lead changing hands seven times – passing to Dale Earnhardt Jr., Kurt Busch, Kahne, Larson, Austin Dillon, Tony Stewart and Matt Kenseth – before Johnson retook the lead with ten laps to go and scored his third win of the 2014 season and first at Michigan. Johnson reflected upon this in a post-race interview, stating that he "had figured out every way to lose this race" and that he "knew we were in the catbird seat and were able to take advantage of it". Harvick described his car as "fast, just wound up on the wrong side of all the strategy".

Race results

Race statistics
 Lead changes: 25 among different drivers
 Cautions/Laps: 8 for 36 
 Red flags: 0
 Time of race: 2 hours, 47 minutes and 19 seconds
 Average speed:

Media

Television

Radio

Standings after the race

Drivers' Championship standings

Manufacturers' Championship standings

Note: Only the first sixteen positions are included for the driver standings.

Note

References

Quicken Loans 400
Quicken Loans 400
Quicken Loans 400
NASCAR races at Michigan International Speedway